Nelson Henrique Barbosa Filho is a Brazilian economist and professor of economics. From 21 December 2015 to 12 May 2016, he was Brazil's Minister of Finance.

Barbosa holds a full professorship at the São Paulo School of Economics of the Getulio Vargas Foundation and is adjunct professor at the Federal University of Rio de Janeiro as well as Researcher at IBRE/FGV and a member of the boards of Cetip and Regional Bank of Brasilia (BRB).

Barbosa holds a PhD in Economics ("Essays on Structuralist Macroeconomics", 2001) from the New School for Social Research in New York City and a master's degree and BA in Economics from the Federal University of Rio de Janeiro.

Barbosa served as Executive Secretary at Brazil's Ministry of Finance from 2011 to 2013. Prior to that, Mr Barbosa held several positions within the federal government. He was Secretary for Economic Issues (2007-2008) and Deputy Secretary for Economic Policy at the Ministry of Finance. He was also the chairman at Bank of Brazil (2009-2013), and a member of the board of Vale SA (2011-2013). His experiences within the government level includes positions at the Central Bank of Brazil (1994-1997), National Development Bank (2005-2006) and Ministry of Planning (2003).

Barbosa was invited by president Dilma Rousseff to join her economic team as Minister of Planning in her second term, having held this position from 1 January 2014 to 18 December 2015 when he replaced Joaquim Levy as Brazil's Minister of Finance.

References

External links

  Prof. Barbosa webpage
  Prof. Barbosa online CV, in Portuguese.
 

|-

20th-century Brazilian economists
21st-century Brazilian economists
Federal University of Rio de Janeiro alumni
Finance Ministers of Brazil
Government ministers of Brazil
Living people
1969 births
St. Francis College people